Mount Weir is a steep section of the polar plateau escarpment with almost all of the rock exposed facing northeast, standing just south of the base of Fulgham Ridge at the head of Ramsey Glacier. Discovered and photographed by U.S. Navy Operation Highjump on Flight 8A of February 16, 1947, and named by Advisory Committee on Antarctic Names (US-ACAN) for Maj. Robert R. Weir, United States Marine Corps (USMC), pilot of this flight.

Mountains of the Ross Dependency
Dufek Coast